Ado-Odo is the metropolitan headquarters of the kingdom of Ado, renowned for its Oduduwa/Obatala temple, the ancient fortress of the traditional practice of Ifá (Ado n'ile Ifa). Oodu'a is also regarded by traditionalists as the mother of all deities worldwide. All of these made Ado an inviolate territory in western Yorubaland—the same "father-figure" status accorded to Ile-Ife. Unlike the other kingdoms, which had at one time or the other engaged in the internecine wars that ravaged Yorubaland in the nineteenth century, Ado stood out as an unconquered sanctuary city-state throughout the period.

Ado-Odo is located in modern-day Ogun State in the southwestern part of Nigeria.

Ado, as an ancient Awori town, could be described as the melting pot of the ancient Ife and Benin traditions, where the languages of these two important communities remain the lingua franca in their shrines. There are relics in the town, specifically at the Oodu'a Temple in Ilaje and its environs, that corroborate this.

In pre-colonial times, the independent state of Ado had at various times been referred to as Ado-Oodu'a, Ado-Ife, Ado-Ibini, and Ado-Awori, all pointing to its generational evolution. The advent of British rule led to the adoption of Ado-Odo as a clear-cut identity, setting the town apart from other major settlements bearing similar names in other parts of Yorubaland (such as Ado-Ekiti, Ado-Awaye and Ado-Soba).

The Ado Kingdom is currently inhabited by the Aworis and Yewas of Ishaga, Imasayi, Ibooro, and Ketu. Other groups found include Eguns (Ogu), Oyos, Ijebus, and Egbas as well as non-Yoruba elements, particularly the Hausa, Igbo, and Ijaw.

The kingdom was founded before the eleventh century, when conditions in Ile-Ife forced inhabitants to search for new, more prosperous lands.

Brief History

Origin Of The People Of Ado-Odo 

When history is rich, summary becomes expansive. To give an apt historical rendition of a foremost Awori Kingdom is an arduous task, which becomes a burden for any historian to summarize. Ado-odo is an ancient Awori town in Yorubland, with a rich history, splendid culture and enviable tradition and heritages.
Ado, as it is popularly called, can be conveniently described as the confluence of Old Ife and Benin traditions. Oral history and documented articles from well-preserved archive revealed that it came to existence as a result of the amalgamation among various settlements of its early founders and forebears.

Ile-Ife, the origin of the Yorubas, is the ancestral home of the good people of Ado-Odo. According to impeccable historical facts, the people of this Awori Kingdom are direct descendants of Oduduwa, the progenitor of Yoruba race. It was founded in the year 1045.

Ado-Odo history is replete with expedition and exploratory sojourn. No wonder the people of Ado origin are found in all spheres of life. From Ile Ife, it was an exodus of groups of different people, at almost the same time, moving southward towards the direction of the coastal area. According to Ifa divination, these migrating people would have their final place of settlement in an abode where their plates were bound to have sunk (the source of the name - Awori).

Various groups left Ile Ife at different time, migrated from Ile Ife far before the advent of Olofin Ogunfunminire group, the most prominent of these groups was the Oranmiyan group led by Olofin Adimula Ojaja corrupted as OJEJE the son of Oranmiyan. On their journey, they travelled on the riverways to Ago-ide (now referred to as Isheri) which was unoccupied by people as at that period where their sacrificial plate (Awo funfun with other items prescribed by Oracle (Ifa) first sunk (Awori) for nine days, Oracle (Ifa) was consulted to confirm if the place is their ordained settlement in search of but Oracle (Ifa) revealed to them that their future homeland was still far away and prescribed the route for them to follow. The plate reappeared from the river on the 9th days. Then they proceeded to follow the plate into Lagos Lagoon and stopped at a Rivershore now called Oto Ido, moved southwards towards Dahormey stopped briefly aa another place now known as Owode Apa and later travelled to Ito River behind Ado-Odo Palace which is an extension of Yewa River where plate finally sunk and never reappeared. The group, therefore, settled at the shore of Ito River at the present-day Ado Odo. Olofin Ojeje group did not meet anybody on all the soil or places the plate went through and sank temporarily.

The leaders of another groups were Bajomu Oyiti Ateludo and his wife Obunni, Alapa popopo  Onitako and Asawo-owun-Adaludo, Aṣọdẹ Onirunmi Ẹkun Jagudẹ, which were purported to have travelled by same route. Other groups were Obalumu Kuseku Oloyin Agba afi awo ekun seso, Alamuwa, Ọba Ira, Orufe group which were purported to have travelled by hunting wide animals, as well as Alawẹ/Aaṣẹjọ/Ọmarun and Osolo group. Each group settled in their fortresses, which later metamorphosed to Ado Kingdom. All these groups settled at different locations around the present day Ado Odo. Bajomu Oyiti, Alapapopo and Onitako group was said to have settled at Ilemu. Other groups settled at Igbonla, Onirumi Ekun Jagude Obalumu Kuseku Oloyin settled at Megun. All these groups who earlier settled at different locations came to realize the presence of one and others living in a close proximity and decide to move towards Bajomo Oyiti/Onitako group and live together, hence Onitako was generally accepted as the founder of Ado Odo. 
Summarily, after a long and adventurous voyage, the place was eventually found, where 'plates sunk' (Awori). Consequently, upon settling in this Ifa-ordained location, the itinerant Ados became the early settlers in what is known today as Ado-Odo and the foundation of Awori subethnic group.

All the various group came with their traditions, power and distinct deities or goddess from Ife and Benin, hence, they are all the Custodians of their shrines and heads of their quarters except Olofin Adimula Ojeje – the leader of Oranmiyan group that came with his father's beaded crown from Ife and the forebearer of Olofin Adimula Oodua royal dynasty in Ado Odo.
 
Olofin Adimula Ojeje, the Son of Oranmiyan left Ile Ife with his two Sons, Asalu Oreje and Iranje with the beaded Crown from his father and other followers and guards. Short while after arrival at Ito River shore, Olofin Adimula Ojeje departed the mortal earth to join his ancestors. Hence, Asalu Oreje, being the first son became the head of Oramiyan group and was latter crowned as the first Olofin Adimula Oodua of Ado Odo or Oba of Ado.

Ancestral Ties of Ado-Odo With The Ile Ife, Benin Kingdom And Sabe In The Republic Of Benin 

The indigenous people of Ado-Odo prehistoric ties with the peoples of Ile Ife, Benin Kingdom in Edo State and Sabe in today's Republic of Benin. History has proved that Olofin Ojeje one of the sons of Oranmiyan, who earlier lived and married in Sabe. He left Sabe for Benin with other Ife people. The intent of Olofin  Ojeje was to teach the Benin people the art of calving statues, sculptures and gold forging (goldsmithing) on the instruction of his father to support of the then Oba of Benin on his quest for Benin people to master this art.

Olofin Ojeje who was doing extremely well in statues crafting /goldsmithing. After many year in Benin, decided to pay visit to his father, Oranmiyan at Ile Ife. On getting to Ile Ife, Oranmiyan has gone on spiritual journey out of Ile Ife. Ojeje met unpalatable situations - the royal stool of Oduduwa was about to be usurped by Obalufon. He challenged Obalufon on the great abomination but could not rescue the situation. Olofin Adimula Ojeje felt uncomfortable and displeased with the socio-political environment in Ile Ife. He therefore consulted Oracle (Ifa) for direction on the step to take. Oracle advised him to take two out of Oranmiyan's beaded crowns and leave Ile Ife with his two Sons Asalu Ojeje and Iranje, his guards and followers to move southwards to locate a land near the river to settle down, rule over and never to return Ile Ife. Oracle (Ifa) further prescribed for him to use plate (white calabash) with other sacrificial items as his compass to his final destination. Olofin Adimula Ojeje took these ancestral crowns to Ado-odo. One of the two crowns is being wear till date by the Olofin Adimula Oodua of Ado-odo while Iranje his brother took the second small crown to settle in IRUNJI after Ito River near Owo town in Yewa south local government of Ogun State.

Preeminence of Oba Ado or Olofin of Ado-Odo Kingdom 

Going by the memory lane, as far back as 1470s upon the arrival of Portuguese into Lagos, the presence and the leadership of Ado Odò was recorded without any intermediary. In the present Lagos state, the historical influence of Ado Odò as a major and pioneer Awori ancient city over major Awori Townships like Itire, Mushin, Isolo, Aguda, Isale Eko, Ojú elegba, Ilogbo Eremi, Ilogbo Elegba, Ibereko, Erikiti, Iragon, Owode Apá, Dopemu, Oto etc.

Ado-Odo, from time immemorial, was a dispersal point for the Aworis and other communities, who dwell in various parts of Lagos State. Notable among these communities is Itire, Lagos, which was founded by Prince Ota-Onitire, who migrated with his offspring to live in Lagos, as a mark of obedience to the directive of the then Olofin Adimula of Ado-odo. This further lends credence to the fact that the Ado Odo is prominent among the Aworis, and the stool of the Olofin Adimula Oodua of Ado Odo is the foremost in the Awori Kingdom.

It was never a thing of where the sacred plate sank but it's widely noted that the final destination of the sacred plate was ADO ODÒ, at Yewa River. Early acceptance of the Bini people into Ado Odò from which the Bini Princess that was humiliated by the Eko people which led to the attack of Eko by Benin through Ado Odò territory remain a valid point of historical reference.

The Ọba of Addo Kingdom known as Ado had been traditionally and historically, an independent monarch and required no approval of any other monarch to be installed as an Oba for Ado Kingdom. 
The prominence of Olofin of Ado Odo are also contained  in the treaty between the Olofin (spelt as Olovee by the British )with the Queen of Britain dated June 17, 1863 with the second treaty of 1891 between the king ,Chiefs and Elders of Ado and the Queen of Britain.

In the year 1887, the British colonial government sought the protection of the British Flag in Ado Kingdom (present day Ogun State, Nigeria). The then Olofin Adimula Oba Ashade Awope Oteni refused to grant the British the permission to hoist the Union Jack in his Country (Ado Kingdom). In 1891, Oba of Ado Kingdom put a blockade on the trade route from the interior of Lagos especially Ado/Badagry trade route which denied Lagos Trader from making any trade. Ado Kingdom is strategically located in the north-east of Lagos and normally charge customs from Traders passing through Ado/Badagry trade routes which link Egbado (Yewa), Egba to Badagry, Lagos and Dahormey. Consequent to this actions, The British Government was obviously not too happy about these and persuaded Olofin Oteni to open the blockade which he emphatically refused to open the trade route.

In February, 1891.Captain George Denton, A British acting Governor took his troops to meet the Oba Oteni on behalf of British Government to further appeal and convince the Oba of Ado Kingdom to open the blockade so that there could be free passage of goods to Lagos. After much persuasion, the Oba Oteni agreed to allow free passage of good along the trade routes and British Government dully made compensation for the loss of custom duties which served as revenue. Unfortunately, this deal did not last too long before it collapsed, hence. Olofin Oteni resumed blockage of trade routes and he was seizing Canoes from Ajilete Traders and other British subjects who refused to pay him tribute.

This act pissed off the British government and there was an order to use force on Ado Kingdom by the British Government.
On 11, March 1891, a detachment of heavy British troops sailed from the Lagos Lagoon to Ado Kingdom.

The Oba Oteni looking at his weak position at that moment, tactically surrendered himself to the British troops to protect his subjects and kingdom, he was removed from his territory to Lagos. His Palace was pillaged and looted by the British troops. Money, artifacts and valuable traditional costumes were taken away.

On May 27, 1891, the Eletu Odibo of Lagos and the Olumegbon of Lagos with other Lagos chiefs requested the permission of the British government to release Olofin Ashade Awope Oteni. Upon his release and signing of the peace treaty between Ado Kingdom and the British Government in August 1891, thereafter, British began conquering diverse Yoruba Kingdom in the hinterland, starting with the Ijebus In 1892, Oyo 1895, Benin 1897 and the Sokoto Caliphate In 1903. Fanuvi Samuel (2019) reported that The Addos, with their valiant Olofin Ashade Oteni actually pioneered Yoruba nationalism in Africa. This further affirm the great influence of Ado Kingdom and his King in the precolonial era. Ado Odo prominence was also recognized by French Government which sought his presence and representation at the treaty of Paris of 1889 during the era of partition of territories by the Colonial authorities. It was then listed and identified as a town on the Shore of Ado River also known as Yewa River.

It is noteworthy that Ado-Odo remains inviolate and was never conquered during the Yoruba civil wars. This propelled her into the status of a sanctuary town where waves of people came to seek refuge and peace and security.

The 1903 Colony of Lagos Gazette No .9 listed the Oba of Ado also called the OLOFIN at the instance of Ooni of Ife, His Imperial Majesty, Oba Adelekan Olubuse 1 along with other prominent Obas like Awujale, Akarigbo and the four revered Egba monarchs namely: The Alake, The Olowu, Oloko (Osile), Agura  in the present Ogun State prior to the evolution of the Nigerian State in 1914. The Oba of Ado that is, the Olofin Adimula of Ado was listed as to the 4th in hierarchy in the said Gazette during the reign of Oba Asade Awope called Oba Otenibotemole.

Among Yoruba Obas that are entitled to wear beaded crown, and the 1941 Conference, where the Oba of Ado-odo and the Alake of Abeokuta only represented the Abeokuta Province, reinforce these assertions. The 1903 meeting among the Yoruba traditional rulers in Lagos, where Olofin of Ado-odo was categorized
The archived report stated that the likes of Agbára, Ketu, Paramole, Egudu Baale, Isaga, Kuoye and all other communities in Ketu Administrative Ward and Agbára Township belong to Ado-odo. In fact, the Olofin Adimula of Ado was also addressed as the Olofin of Addo and Erekiti Kingdoms in the past Erekiti is presently in Badagry local government area of Lagos. It was recorded that Bishop Ajayi Crowther in 1840s visited the ODUDUWA Temple, Ilaje, Ado Odo when Oba Akintoye, the then Eleko of Eko expressed resentment over inability to join Oduduwa Festival in Ado Odo . The Journal of Nigerian History 1962 quoted Morton Williams,a social anthropologist in his studies of Trans-Atlantic slave trade and Oyo tradition 1640 -1830 stated that the AWORI CHIEFTAIN was not under the influence of Alafin of OYO nor any of the Supreme of Ọba of Yoruba race , A I Asiwaju ,1976 ,at pages 36/37 that Ado Kingdom was at no time under Oyo Imperial Control unlike Egba and Dahomean vassal Kingdoms that paid tributes to the Alafin of Oyo .

Oba Jacob Ogabi Fadeyi Akapo, MBE, MON, (1953-1989) was a principal member of Western Region House of Chiefs and later the Permanent Chairman of Egbado Council of Obas and Chiefs following the creation of Ogun State in 1976 until he joined his ancestors in 1989.

Presently, Olofin of Ado-Odò and/or Ọba of Ado during the reign of Oba Akanni ranks next in rank to the Paramount Ruler in Yewa Traditional Council. The Ado monarch equally enjoys special first-class status culminating in the front row seating arrangement he enjoys next to the current four Paramount Rulers in the Ogun State Council of Obas and the Chairman of Ado odo/Ota Traditional Council or Obas Council. (Ogun State Oba new Law 2022)

Ado-Odo: An Unconquered Territory 

Ado-odo was at no time subservient or vassal to any bigger territory. From inception, it has been autonomous, and it prides itself as an unconquerable and unconquered territory. Furthermore, Ado-odo Kingdom remains an Awori town that was never conquered or captured. During the Egba and Dahomey wars, warriors of the Town provided fortress and protection for the Town against invasion. They were able to repel the aggression of the advancing enemies. To gain free access to the hinterlands from Badagry, the Church Missionary Society (CMS) led by Henry Townsend had to persuade Ọba Aike (Akesile 1) the reigning Olofin Adimula Of Ado Odo with the assurance that they are for peace and to initiate the process of ending the Yoruba civil wars of the nineteenth century. Though seldom seen in the public then, he as the Olofin of Ado kingdom agreed to the peace deal negotiation promoted by the Christian Missionaries between Adó and Ẹ̀gbá in 1853 at the place now known as Onibuku. It was through this peace deal (recorded as exemplary and the first of its kind in this part of Africa) that made the route between Badagry and the hinterlands more secured and safer for free movement of people and goods cum prosperous trade. (NAI: Christian Missionary papers CA/031).

Furthermore, the unconquered history of Ado Odo made it a place of refuge for all and sundry in the event of war in the adjoining town especially during Egba-Dohomey war that disrupted and scattered most of the town between present day Abeokuta and Ado Odo. Up to present day, Ado-Odo is a home to all tribes and ethic nationalities. The comely dispositions of the indigenes have drawn an array of non-indigenes, from far and near, to the ancient Town. In Ado-Odo, non-indigenes and foreigners are integrated, given clemency to grow, prosper and deploy their God-given talents for the socio-economic growth of the Town. This rare opportunity has offered them the privilege and leverage to be property owners in the Land of the Aworis without an iota of hindrance. Indeed, Ado-Odo is a home away from home and an investment destination to all non-indigenes who are resident in the Town. A visit to Ado-odo will surely convince you.

Monarch

The traditional ruler, or Oba, of Ado-Odo is referred to as the Oba of Ado and Olofin Adimula Oodua of Ado-Odo; the stool is vacant after the demise of His Imperial Majesty Oba Abdul-Lateef Adeniran Akanni Ojikutujoye I who joined his ancestors on the 7th of January, 2022, when he died.

In 1889, the colonial authorities recognized River Ado and the name of the Kingdom remains till date.
During the reign of Oba Ogabi Akapo, the Oba of Ado served as Vice President Western House of Chiefs, and later as Permanent Chairman, Ogun State Council of Obas for Egbado Traditional Council – following the creation of Ogun State in 1976 – and held the office until his demise in 1989, shortly after the creation of Ado Odo/Ota Local Government Area.

Boundaries 

From the time of its founding, Ado was a dispersal point for the Aworis and other communities now dwelling in various parts of Lagos State. Notable in this regard, according to tradition, is the migration of Prince Ota Onitire to the Lagos area, following a directive by Olofin of Ado for him to establish his dominion in Itire-Lagos. Thus, the installation rites for the paramount ruler, Onitire, of Itire-Lagos take place in Itire (Ado) in Ere Ward, where his subjects have called for the resuscitation of its Oba-ship stool by the Ogun State Government.

The people of Iworo, like their counterparts of Ojo, Ilado, Ale, Erikiti, Jarun, Ilogbo, Iragbo, and Ibreko ancestry, all migrated from Ado.

Historical evidence affirms that Ado, to a greater extent, controlled her trade routes along Badagry and indeed exercised traditional political authority over adjoining the villages of Igbo Eji, Ikoga-Zebbe, Ikoga Ile, Bandu, Potta, and Igborosun; all were excised from it in 1976 and merged with Lagos State. Ado also shares boundaries with Ilobi at the extreme end of Oke-Ogbun (now called Owode) a fast-developing nodal town whose dwellers are either of Egbado (Yewa) or Awori extraction, having their roots in Ado. Similarly, it shares boundaries with Ilase in present-day Oke-Odan, which came into existence like Ajilete as “refugee camps” for victims of war-ravaged communities in the heyday of the Egba Dahomean military campaigns of the last century. Other communities that were hitherto part of Adoland include Ijako, Owo, Ishagbo Oke, Ishgbo Isale, and Iranje. The Igboro ruling house in Ado and other landed gentry own sizable farmlands in these communities – formerly in Ado-Odo/Igbesa district – until they were merged with Ifekowajo Local Government Area in 1982 and lately with Egbado South Local Government Area. There is also evidence that Ado boundaries with its sister town Ota were at one time located in Ota territory but were later re-adjusted for administrative convenience.

Economic Activities

In the 1960s, the Obafemi Awolowo led Action Group administration of the Western Region acquired a vast expanse of land in Ado-Odo. Part of it was used to establish farm settlements. Being an agrarian and riverine community, the main economic activities of Ado are farming and trading. Commercial farming is pronounced in the community through co-operative societies and private investors in cocoa and oil palm plantations as well as other tree crops. Fishery and animal husbandry are also practiced.

Festivals

The notable festivals in Ado-Odo are connected with either the traditional religion or Christianity and Islam. Ado's ancestral Oduduwa festival (called “Odun Alaje”) involves the parade of two bulls around the town, rope games by able-bodied men, and using a soft cane (Igbo) to freely whip passers-by. The raiding of stray fowl and dogs is synonymous with traditional cleansing rites during this festival, though owners are forewarned through the town crier, or Itepa Ilus. Igbi-Ora and gbedu drums are used for entertainment throughout the festival. The traditional devotees are led by the Oba Ira and other chiefs notably Oluwo, Olomu-Ajiga, and women chieftains (Alaje and Aragba), to entertain spectators with dance steps on special days.

climate
In Ado Odo, the wet season is overcast, the dry season is partly cloudy, and it is hot and oppressive year round.The temperature typically varies from 74°F to 91°F and is rarely below 69°F or above 93°F.

References



Ancient cities
Ogun State